Word of Mouf is the second studio album by American rapper Ludacris; it was released on November 27, 2001, by Disturbing tha Peace and Def Jam South. It contains the singles, "Rollout (My Business)", "Area Codes", "Move Bitch", and "Saturday (Oooh Oooh!)".

Critical reception

Jason Birchmeier of AllMusic called Word of Mouf a "superstar affair that aims for mass appeal with a broad array of different styles" and enjoyed "witty puns and sly innuendoes" displayed in songs such as "Area Codes".  However, he felt that "amid all of these various team-ups you do lose a little bit of the sincere, personal edge that had characterized much of Ludacris' debut."  Soren Baker of the Chicago Tribune also praised the album's comedic nature, commenting that "Whether he's delivering a punchy one-liner, exaggerating his rhyme flow to a silly extreme or cleverly deploying pop culture references, Ludacris keeps the mood light and festive. Even his skits are funny enough that they could serve as the foundation for a top-tier comedy album."

Commercial performance
The album debuted at number 3 on the US Billboard 200 chart, with first-week sales of 281,000 copies in the United States, The album was certified 3x Multi-Platinum by the Recording Industry Association of America (RIAA) on October 31, 2002. As of July 2014, the album has sold over 3,674,000 copies in the United States to date. This is Ludacris' best selling album. It was nominated at the 45th Grammy Awards for Best Rap Album, but lost to The Eminem Show.

Track listing

 All tracks are co-written by Christopher Bridges

Samples and interpolations
"Coming 2 America"
"Requiem", 3rd movement (Dies irae) by Wolfgang Amadeus Mozart (Conductor and orchestra unknown)
Symphony No. 9, "From the New World", 4th movement (Allegro con fuoco) by Antonín Dvořák (Conductor and orchestra unknown)

"Rollout (My Business)"
"Yay Boy" by Africando

"Area Codes"
"Do It ('Til  You're Satisfied)" by B.T. Express

"Growing Pains"
"I Forgot To Be Your Lover" by William Bell

"Welcome to Atlanta"
"Five Minutes of Funk" by Whodini
"Do it baby" by The Miracles

Charts

Weekly charts

Year-end charts

Certifications

References

2001 albums
Disturbing tha Peace albums
Albums produced by Bangladesh (record producer)
Albums produced by Jazze Pha
Albums produced by Jermaine Dupri
Albums produced by Organized Noize
Albums produced by Swizz Beatz
Albums produced by Timbaland
Def Jam Recordings albums
Ludacris albums